Hamilton West was a provincial electoral district in Ontario, Canada, that was represented in the Legislative Assembly of Ontario from 1894 to 1934 and from 1967 to 2007.

Members of Provincial Parliament

This riding has elected the following members of the Legislative Assembly of Ontario:

Provincial election results

External links
Legislative Assembly of Ontario - Past & Present MPPs 
 Elections Ontario  1999 results and 2003 results

Former provincial electoral districts of Ontario